Katherine Mary "Daisy" Dick (born 29 March 1972, in Oxford) is a British three-day eventing rider. With her horse Spring Along, she won the bronze medal for Great Britain in the team eventing at the 2008 Summer Olympics in Beijing. She studied at Worcester College, Oxford.

Dick is the daughter of jockey Dave Dick and eventing rider Caroline Dick. In October 2009, she married Charles Berkeley, scion of Berkeley Castle.

External links

Athlete bio at 2008 Olympics site

British event riders
Olympic bronze medallists for Great Britain
Equestrians at the 2008 Summer Olympics
Olympic equestrians of Great Britain
British female equestrians
Living people
1972 births
Olympic medalists in equestrian
Alumni of Worcester College, Oxford
Medalists at the 2008 Summer Olympics